Drycothaea is a genus of longhorn beetles of the subfamily Lamiinae.

 Drycothaea angustifrons (Breuning, 1943)
 Drycothaea anteochracea (Breuning, 1974)
 Drycothaea bicolorata Martins & Galileo, 1990
 Drycothaea brasiliensis (Breuning, 1974)
 Drycothaea cribrata Bates, 1881
 Drycothaea curtula Bates, 1885
 Drycothaea estola (Lameere, 1893)
 Drycothaea gaucha Galileo & Martins, 2008
 Drycothaea guadeloupensis Fleutiaux & Sallé, 1889
 Drycothaea indistincta Lingafelter & Nearns, 2007
 Drycothaea jolyi Galileo & Martins, 2010
 Drycothaea maculata Martins & Galileo, 2003
 Drycothaea mexicana (Breuning, 1974)
 Drycothaea ochreoscutellaris (Breuning, 1940)
 Drycothaea ocularis Galileo & Martins, 2010
 Drycothaea parva Bates, 1885
 Drycothaea rotundicollis Galileo & Martins, 2010
 Drycothaea sallei (Thomson, 1868)
 Drycothaea spreta Bates, 1885
 Drycothaea stictica Bates, 1881
 Drycothaea testaceipes Bates, 1881
 Drycothaea truncatipennis Tavakilian, 1997
 Drycothaea turrialbae (Breuning, 1943)
 Drycothaea viridescens (Buquet, 1857)
 Drycothaea wappesi Galileo & Martins, 2010

References

Calliini